Fossil Cave (5L81), formerly known as The Green Waterhole, is a cave in the Limestone Coast region of south-eastern South Australia. It is popular with cave divers and is notable for being both a unique  paleontological site and the "type locality" for very rare crustaceans (syncarids - Koonunga sp.) which to date have been found only in caves and Blue Lake in the Mount Gambier region.

Description and naming
The cave is formed in 30-million-year-old Oligocene coralline limestone. The cave is a karst sinkhole and is largely filled with water.

The name of the cave was changed on 23 April 1989 by the Government of South Australia from The Green Waterhole to Fossil Cave with the change being published in The South Australian Government Gazette on 4 May 1989.

Fossils
The probable accumulation mode was by animals drowning when they fell into the cave while attempting to use it as a source of drinking water. Dating of the subfossil remains indicated that their deposition occurred mainly between 15,000 and 40,000 years ago. As well as representing many living animals, examples of extinct species recovered from the cave include the birds Centropus colossus and Orthonyx hypsilophus, and the mammals Thylacinus cynocephalus, Thylacoleo carnifex, Propleopus oscillans, Macropus titan, Protemnodon anak,  and the sthenurine kangaroos Procoptodon gilli, Procoptodon maddocki and Simosthenurus occidentalis.

Exploration
Fossils were first collected from the cave in 1964 followed by a further collection in 1968 and logged with the South Australian Museum. During the next two decades a number of more extensive surveying, sedimentology and bone-recovery operations were carried out by cave divers working in conjunction with palaeontologist Dr Rod Wells and researcher Cate Newton (Flinders University) and the South Australian Underwater Speleological Society (SAUSS) Inc. 

The cave's submerged extent has been surveyed at least three times including by the Flinders University Underwater Club (FUUC) in 1978, Allum and Garrad in 1979 and SAUSS in 1987.

Recreational diving
Fossil Cave is a notable cave diving site.  Access for cave diving is limited to holders of the Cave Divers Association of Australia's Advanced Cave grade.

See also 
 List of sinkholes of Australia

References

External links
Cave Diving in Fossil Cave

Limestone caves
Limestone Coast
Caves of South Australia
Pleistocene paleontological sites of Australia
Sinkholes of Australia
Underwater diving sites in Australia